A petrifying well is a well or other body of water which gives objects a stone-like appearance. If an object is placed into such a well and left there for a period of months or years, the object acquires a stony exterior.

Nature
If an object is placed into such a well and left there for a period of weeks or months the object acquires a stony exterior. At one time this property was believed to be a result of magic or witchcraft, but it is an entirely natural phenomenon and due to a process of evaporation and deposition in waters with an unusually high mineral content.

This process of petrifying is not to be confused with petrification wherein the constituent molecules of the original object are replaced (and not merely overlaid) with molecules of stone or mineral.

Examples

Notable examples of petrifying wells in England are the spring at Mother Shipton's Cave in Knaresborough and Matlock Bath, in Derbyshire. While in Ireland, such wells were noted by John Rutty on Howth Head, among other locations.

See also
Speleothem
Stalactite
Stalagmite

References

External links
Mother Shipton's Cave & the Petrifying Well

Water wells
Witchcraft in England
English folklore